Angus James Macdonald (born 12 January 1981 in Whangarei) is a retired New Zealand rugby union footballer. Macdonald has played for Auckland, the Blues, Glasgow Warriors, New Zealand Maori and the All Blacks in a career that began in 2001. Angus Macdonald is known for his versatility, as he has played in various positions in the forwards including Lock, Flanker and Number 8. It was this ability to play multiple positions capably that led to his selection in the 2005 Northern Hemisphere tour, he joined Chris Masoe, Neemia Tialata Isaia Toeava as All Black coach Graham Henry looked to strengthen depth by breaking in players that could take up many positions. Macdonald was part of the champion Blues Super 14 campaign in 2003 and has captained his province; at the young age of 24.

Angus comes from a strong rugby bloodline as his father Hamish Macdonald and his uncle Doug Bruce played for the All Blacks, while another uncle Roddy Macdonald played for Northland and his brother was a Canterbury Colt.

Macdonald signed for Glasgow Warriors for the season 2012–13 in a two-year deal. While with the provincial Glasgow club he was affiliated to Aberdeen GSFP RFC. He retired from rugby union due to a neck injury in February 2013. He played 4 games for the Pro12 club.

Notes and references

External links
 

1981 births
Living people
Rugby union flankers
Auckland rugby union players
New Zealand rugby union players
New Zealand international rugby union players
Māori All Blacks players
New Zealand people of Scottish descent
Blues (Super Rugby) players
Glasgow Warriors players
Aberdeen GSFP RFC players
New Zealand expatriate rugby union players
Expatriate rugby union players in Japan
Expatriate rugby union players in Scotland
New Zealand expatriate sportspeople in Scotland
New Zealand expatriate sportspeople in Japan
Toyota Verblitz players
Coca-Cola Red Sparks players
Rugby union players from Whangārei